The 1976–77 New England Whalers season was the fifth season of operation of the New England Whalers in the World Hockey Association. The Whalers placed fourth in the Eastern Division, qualifying fourth for the playoffs, losing in the first round to the Quebec Nordiques.

Offseason

Regular season

Final standings

Schedule and results

Playoffs

The Whalers met the Quebec Nordiques in the first round of the playoffs. The Nordiques defeated the Whalers 4–1 to win the round. The Nordiques would go on to win the league championship.

Quebec Nordiques 4, New England Whalers 1 – Division Quarterfinals

Player statistics

Awards and records

Transactions

Draft picks
New England's draft picks at the 1976 WHA Amateur Draft.

Farm teams

See also
1976–77 WHA season

References

External links

New
New
New England Whalers seasons
New England
New England